Lune Rouge may refer to:

 La lune rouge, 2013 Moroccan drama film directed by Hassan Benjelloun
 Lune Rouge (album) by Tokimonsta, 2017 
 Lune Rouge for piano, Op. 13, by Alissa Firsova 
 La lune Rouge, novel by Jean Lemieux that is set on Entry Island, 2009